Ayakashi may refer to:

 Ayakashi (yōkai), the collective name for yōkai that appear above the surface of some body of water

Series
 Ayakashi (visual novel), a 2005 Japanese horror visual novel with a 2008 anime adaptation
 Ayakashi: Samurai Horror Tales, a Japanese horror anime television series aired in January 2006
 Ayakashi Ninden Kunoichiban, a 1997 dating sim
 Ayakashi no Shiro, a 1990 role-playing video game
 Ayakashi Triangle, a Japanese fantasy, romantic comedy manga series
 Ghost Slayers Ayashi (Tenpō Ibun Ayakashi Ayashi), a Japanese historical fantasy anime television series aired in October 2006

Characters
 Ayakashi Sisters, a group of villains in the Sailor Moon series
 The monsters used by the Gedoushu in Samurai Sentai Shinkenger
 The monsters featured in the anime/manga Kekkaishi
 The monsters featured in the anime/manga Omamori Himari
 The high-level spirits featured in the onging anime/manga Natsume's Book of Friends
 The monsters featured in the anime/manga xxxHolic
 The monsters featured in the anime/manga Ushio to Tora
 The monsters featured in the anime/manga Noragami
 Numano Himemiko from the anime/manga Kamisama Hajimemashita